Treasure Valley Christian School (TVCS) is a private pre-K-12 Christian school in Ontario, Oregon, United States.  Although it is non-denominational, it is located on the campus of and sponsored by Treasure Valley Baptist Church.  TVCS is a member of the Association of Christian Schools International and teaches using A Beka curriculum.  On May 31, 2014, TVCS graduated its first graduating class of 2 seniors.

Demographics
The student population at TVCS as of 2009-2010 was approximately 90% white, 7% Hispanic and 2% Asian.

References

External links
 School website

Christian schools in Oregon
High schools in Malheur County, Oregon
Christian educational institutions
Private middle schools in Oregon
Private elementary schools in Oregon
Ontario, Oregon
1976 establishments in Oregon
Educational institutions established in 1976